John Cashin may refer to:

John L. Cashin Jr. (1928–2011), American civil rights campaigner and politician
John M. Cashin (1892–1970), United States federal judge